Khristo Vodenicharov (born 20 November 1966) is a Bulgarian biathlete. He competed at the 1988 Winter Olympics and the 1992 Winter Olympics.

References

1966 births
Living people
Bulgarian male biathletes
Olympic biathletes of Bulgaria
Biathletes at the 1988 Winter Olympics
Biathletes at the 1992 Winter Olympics
Place of birth missing (living people)
20th-century Bulgarian people